The Indian Cyber Crime Coordination Centre (I4C) is a government initiative to deal with cybercrime in India, in a coordinated and effective manner. It is affiliated to the Ministry of Home Affairs, Government of India.

History 
The scheme to set up the Indian Cyber Crime Coordination Centre was approved in October 2018 by the Ministry of Home Affairs (India). It was inaugurated in New Delhi in January 2020 by Amit Shah, the Home Minister of India.

In June 2020, on the recommendation of I4C, the Government of India banned 59 Chinese origin mobile apps.

Overview 
The Indian Cyber Crime Coordination Centre has 7 components which are
 National Cyber Crime Threat Analytics Unit (TAU)
 National Cyber Crime Reporting Portal
 National Cyber Crime Training Centre
 Cyber Crime Ecosystem Management Unit
 National Cyber Crime Research and Innovation Centre
 National Cyber Crime Forensic Laboratory (NCFL) Ecosystem
 Platform for Joint Cyber Crime Investigation Team

See also 
 National Cyber Coordination Centre
 Cybercrime in India

Reference

External links 
 Details about Indian Cybercrime Coordination Centre (I4C) Scheme (Ministry of Home Affairs)

Ministry of Home Affairs (India)
Internet in India
2018 establishments in India
Cybercrime in India
Government agencies established in 2018